Thysanoidmaa is a genus of moths of the family Crambidae described by George Hampson in 1891.

Species
Thysanoidma octalis Hampson, 1891
Thysanoidma stellata (Warren, 1896)

References

External links

Musotiminae
Crambidae genera
Taxa named by George Hampson